Saldus Zeme is a regional newspaper published in Latvia.

Mass media in Saldus
Newspapers published in Latvia